Allopsalliota is a fungal genus in the family Agaricaceae. A monotypic genus, it consists of the single species Allopsalliota geesterani, found in the Netherlands. The specific epithet honors Dutch mycologist Rudolph Arnold Maas Geesteranus. Allopsalliota was circumscribed in 1998 to contain what was then known as Agaricus geesterani, a species first described in 1986 by Cornelis Bas and Paul Heinemann.

See also
 List of Agaricales genera
 List of Agaricaceae genera

References

 

Agaricaceae
Fungi of Europe
Monotypic Agaricales genera